Yanrey Station, often referred to as Yanrey, is a pastoral lease that operates as a sheep station.

The station is made up of broad sandy plains with areas of alluvial clay plains. The Yannanie River flows north-south through the property with flood plains extending outward. The property is able to hold a maximum number of 47,000 sheep.

The station was originally established by John and David Stewart. It was sold to Thomas Frederick de Pledge following the death of John Stewart. De Pledge was already familiar with the area having worked for the Stewarts as a jackaroo and for Alexander Forrest and Septimus Burt on neighbouring Minderoo Station for seven years. He also worked to improve the flock so that Yanrey wool would always fetch high prices at market.

In 1906 Yanrey was carrying a flock of approximately 30,000 sheep. A cyclone in 1909 wreaked havoc at Yanrey with all of the windmills destroyed, miles of fencing lost and the country left under water.

By the 1920s both horses and camels as well as motor vehicles were used to transport the wool clip from stations in the area. Motor vehicles were unable to traverse roads used by stock in the wet, so between 1927 and 1930 a number of roads were gazette for motor vehicle use only. One of the roads was built to Yanrey.

Alex Maitland stepped down as station manager in 1952 and was replaced with Ashley Paterson.

Yanrey was stocked with 12,730 sheep and 1,210 cattle in 1979.

Homestead
The homestead was initially constructed in 1901, with a further expansion of the eastern wing in 1915. The main building has a timber frame covered with corrugated iron. The rectangular shaped homestead has twin hipped roofs and a surrounding verandah reflecting the two stage construction. The homestead is heritage listed.

See also
List of ranches and stations

References

Pilbara
Pastoral leases in Western Australia
Stations (Australian agriculture)
Homesteads in Western Australia
Heritage places of Western Australia